The 1942 North Dakota gubernatorial election was held on November 3, 1942. Incumbent Democrat John Moses defeated Republican nominee Oscar W. Hagen with 57.62% of the vote.

Primary elections
Primary elections were held on June 30, 1942.

Democratic primary

Candidates
John Moses, incumbent Governor

Results

Republican primary

Candidates
Oscar W. Hagen, incumbent Lieutenant Governor
Earl D. Symington, Speaker of the North Dakota House of Representatives

Results

General election

Candidates
John Moses, Democratic
Oscar W. Hagen, Republican

Results

References

1942
North Dakota
Gubernatorial